Arthur Woodland (2 December 1895–1979) was an English footballer who played in the Football League for Notts County and Southend United.

References

19th-century births
1941 deaths
English footballers
Association football midfielders
English Football League players
St Helens Town A.F.C. players
Norwich City F.C. players
Notts County F.C. players
Southend United F.C. players
Pontypridd F.C. players
Leamington F.C. players